The 2022–23 F.C. Copenhagen season is the club's 31st season in existence, all of which have been competed in the top flight of Danish football. In addition to the domestic league, Copenhagen will participate in this season's editions of the Danish Cup and, by virtue of earning the 2021-22 Danish Superliga Championship, will compete in the UEFA Champions League. The season covers the period from 1 July 2022 to 30 June 2023.

Players

Current squad

Youth players in use

Out on loan

Non-competitive

Pre-season

Mid-season

Atlantic Cup

Competitions

Overview

Competition record

Superliga

League table

Results by round - Regular season

Championship round

Results by round - Championship round

Regular season

Championship round

Danish Cup

UEFA Champions League

Play-off round 
The draw for the play-off round was held on 2 August 2022.

Group stage

Statistics

Appearances 

This includes all competitive matches and refers to all squad members playing throughout the season, regardless of their current roster status.

Goalscorers 

This includes all competitive matches.

Assists 

This includes all competitive matches.

Clean sheets 

This includes all competitive matches.

Disciplinary record 

This includes all competitive matches.

References

External links

F.C. Copenhagen seasons
Copenhagen
Copenhagen